Zhamanshin is a meteorite crater in Kazakhstan. The crater is exposed at the surface.

Description 
It is believed that the Zhamanshin crater is the site of the most recent meteorite impact event of the magnitude that could have produced a disruption comparable to that of a nuclear winter, but it was not sufficiently large enough to have caused a mass extinction.

Preliminary papers in the late 1970s suggested either Elgygytgyn, or Zhamanshin, as the source of the Australasian strewnfield.

References 

Impact craters of Kazakhstan
Pleistocene impact craters
Pleistocene Asia
Geography of Aktobe Region